The 2019 Ferrari Challenge Europe is the 27th season of Ferrari Challenge Europe and its predecessor Ferrari Challenge Italy. The season consisted of 7 rounds, starting at the Bahrain International Circuit on February 16 and ending at the Mugello Circuit on October 26.

Calendar

Entry list 
All teams and drivers used the Ferrari 488 Challenge fitted with Pirelli tyres.

Trofeo Pirelli

Coppa Shell

Results and standings

Race results

Championship standings 
Points were awarded to the top ten classified finishers as follows:

Trofeo Pirelli

Coppa Shell

See also 
 2019 Finali Mondiali

References

External links 
Official website

Europe 2019
Ferrari Challenge Europe